TSS Anglesey was a steam turbine cargo vessel operated by the London and North Western Railway from 1888 to 1910.

History
She was built by Harland and Wolff for the London and North Western Railway in 1888 and put on the Holyhead – Dublin route. She was one of a trio of ships built over four years for this route, all of a similar size. On 25 November 1888, a fire broke out whilst she was on a voyage from Dublin to Holyhead. Cargo to the value of £2,000 was destroyed.

She was disposed of in 1910.

References

1887 ships
Steamships
Ships built in Belfast
Ships of the London and North Western Railway
Ships built by Harland and Wolff
Ship fires
Maritime incidents in November 1888